Carthaginian II was a steel-hulled brig outfitted as a whaler, which served as a symbol of that industry in the harbor of the former whaling town Lāhainā on the Hawaiian island of Maui. Built in 1920 and brought to Maui in 1973, the square-rigged tall ship served as a whaling museum until 2005, and after being sunk to create an artificial reef, now serves as a diving destination.

History 
The boat was built in 1920 in Kiel, Germany at the Friedrich Krupp Germaniawerft shipyard as Mary. Because of the terms imposed in the wake of the Armistice, Germany was required to hand over all new ships built as large steam or motor vessels, and Mary was one of a group of forty sailing ships completed at Kiel intended to operate primarily under sail, with auxiliary motor power.

Shortly after completion, Mary was sold to Denmark and renamed Familiens Haab in 1922, and then was sold to Sweden and renamed Komet in 1923. Komet worked the Baltic Sea as a freighter for cement. In 1970 the boat was decommissioned. Because the hull was built using steel at the Krupp yard which had been intended for U-boats, Komet (and her sisters) developed a reputation for longevity.

The original Carthaginian had been laid down and launched as the Baltic Sea trading schooner Wandia, which was purchased by R. Tucker Thompson in Acapulco in 1964 and later fitted as a square-rigged whaling ship in San Pedro for scenes in the 1966 film Hawaii. The ship was renamed for the eponymous ship in the 1959 novel Hawaii by James A. Michener, on which the 1966 film was based. After filming, Carthaginian was purchased by the non-profit "Lahaina Restoration Foundation" (LRF). Following a brief return voyage to California, it returned to Lahaina in 1967 as a whaling ship museum and tourist attraction. However, Carthaginian was destroyed after it ran aground on the Lahaina Reef on Easter Sunday 1973 while sailing to dry dock at Oahu, and Komet was acquired to replace it.

Komet was purchased in 1973 by LRF for approximately $21,000 and moved from Søby, Denmark to Hawaii by an all-Lahaina crew under diesel power, a voyage that lasted 105 days, arriving on September 7, 1973 after passing through Madeira and the Panama Canal. After installing  of cement and steel ballast to balance the rigging, which was being assembled onshore, it was renamed Carthaginian II and restored over several years. Masts made of spruce, a deck of eucalyptus, and other details for a whaling supply ship of the 19th century were installed. In 1980, the ship was opened as a floating whaling museum.

However, the addition of ballast allowed moisture to condense inside the steel hull, which rusted to a point where it nearly split in half. LRF was spending $50,000 per year to maintain the ship. In 2003, LRF approached Atlantis Submarines, proposing to sell it to be sunk as a tourist attraction. Atlantis cleaned Carthaginian II in preparation for its sinking, spending approximately $350,000 on preparations including an environmental study. LRF was given 120 days to replace the vessel before the berth would be reclaimed for commercial operations. The berth was proposed as a potential home for the voyaging canoes Mo'okiha o Pi'ilani or Mo'olele, but Mo'okiha was berthed at Maalea Harbor instead in 2016.

Today, it serves as a destination for diving expeditions and submarine tours. Scuba Diving and Sport Diver have rated the site as one of the top locations for shipwreck diving.

References

External links 
  (PDF; 1.2 MB)  
 Dives to Carthaginian II with a history of the boat 
 Flyer of the dive boat company Atlantis Submarine Tour Maui with a location sketch to the wreck. 
 
 
 
 
 

Maui
Whaling museums
1920 ships
Ships built in Kiel
Sailing ships of Germany
Ships sunk as artificial reefs
Ships sunk as dive sites
Shipwrecks of Hawaii
Lahaina, Hawaii